The 2006 Eurocup Formula Renault 2.0 season was the sixteenth Eurocup Formula Renault 2.0 season. The season began at Zolder on 29 April and finished at the Barcelona on 29 October, after fourteen rounds.

Motopark Academy's Filipe Albuquerque who took a pair of double wins at Nürburgring and Barcelona clinched the championship title in the final round at Barcelona by eight points ahead of JD Motorsport's Chris van der Drift, who won two races during the season at Misano and Donington Park. Van der Drift also finished as top rookie. Carlo van Dam finished in third for SG Formula, after win at Le Mans and another four podiums. Another driver who won on Bugatti Circuit was Bertrand Baguette who finished two points behind van Dam for Epsilon Euskadi. Kasper Andersen completed the top five without scoring a win. Laurent Groppi won two races of the opening round at Zolder, but contested just six races, as well as Donington winner Sébastien Buemi. Dani Clos won at Istanbul Park and Misano, but due to disqualification in the second race at Misano he managed only seventh place in the series' standings.

Teams and drivers

Calendar

Championship standings

Drivers
Points are awarded to the drivers as follows:

* - only awarded to race one polesitters

† — Drivers did not finish the race, but were classified as they completed over 90% of the race distance.

Teams

References

External links
 Official website of the Eurocup Formula Renault 2.0 championship

Eurocup
Eurocup Formula Renault
Renault Eurocup